The Breeder Bombs is a role-playing game adventure published by TSR in 1984 for the Marvel Super Heroes role-playing game.

Plot summary
The Breeder Bombs is a scenario pitting the X-Men against Magneto, who has planted four dirty radioactive bombs that the heroes must deactivate before they go off. The Breeder Bombs pits the Uncanny X-Men against Magneto and other super-villains in the X-Men's headquarters and sites in the United States, USSR, Australia, and Chile. The players take the parts of the X-Men, attacked within their own headquarters by a surprise visitor who has an even more surprising motive. Seven chapters lead the characters through a search to destroy four "breeder" bombs designed to increase radiation levels and cause millions of mutations.

Publication history
MH1 The Breeder Bombs was written by Jeff Grubb, and was published by TSR, Inc., in 1984 as a 16-page book, a large color map, and an outer folder. This scenario has 16 pages, and is packed with a cover folder containing character details and a double-sided 22"x17" map.

Reception
Marcus L. Rowland reviewed The Breeder Bombs for White Dwarf #62, rating it 7/10 overall. He stated: "There are several tricks and twists, which lead to an amusing and apocalyptic conclusion." Reviewing the adventures The Breeder Bombs, Time Trap, and Murderworld! together, Rowland declared that "All three adventures work reasonably well, but stress combat above role-play or campaign development. None give any opportunity for the characters to use their secret identities (an important feature of the game rules), all are extremely violent."

Craig Sheeley reviewed the adventure in Space Gamer #70. Sheeley felt that "Breeder Bombs should please any X-Men fan: it features plenty of slugfests, lots of chances to display the X-Men's prowess, and a lineup of some major Marvel villains, including the justly-feared Sentinel robots."  He called the maps "well-made" and noted that the Danger Room level of the X-Mansion was "a welcome addition to the amp in the original game".  He commented that "TSR made one major mistake with the adventure: They forgot to include counters for the X-Men and their foes in the game set.  The counters are a must for the map movement and add greatly to the game, and the only counter available is the Wolverine counter from the basic game."  Seeley concluded his review by saying, "Breeder Bombs is a pretty expensive adventure to come without counters, and kind of simple at that: the characters are more led around by their noses than by any merit of their own.  Still, if what you want is plenty of combat, Breeder Bombs is your baby."

Reviews
Game News #8 (Oct. 1985)
Different Worlds #46 (May/June 1987)

References

External links
Something Awful

Marvel Comics role-playing game adventures
Role-playing game supplements introduced in 1984